424 is a year in the 5th century of the Gregorian calendar.

424  or 4-2-4  may also refer to:
 424 BC, a year in the 5th century BC of the Gregorian calendar
 MÁV Class 424, a class of Hungarian steam locomotives
 Area code 424, California, United States
4-2-4 (locomotive), a steam locomotive configuration in Whyte notation
4-2-4 (association football), an association football (soccer) field formation